Euripus or Euripo(s) can refer to:

 Euripus Strait in Central Greece, between Euboea and the main Greek peninsula
 Chalcis, a town located on that strait, also known in the Middle Ages as Euripus
 Euripus (Acarnania), an ancient city in Acarnania, Greece
 Euripus (genus) a genus of butterflies